Mike Verich was a member of the Ohio House of Representatives from 1983 to 1998.  His district consisted of a portion of Trumbull County, Ohio.  He resigned to take up a position on the Ohio State Employment Relations Board (SERB) before his ninth term commenced in January 1999. His brother Chris was appointed to succeed him.

References

http://columbus.bizjournals.com/columbus/stories/1998/12/14/tidbits.html

Democratic Party members of the Ohio House of Representatives
Living people
Year of birth missing (living people)